Amadou Diallo (born 13 June 1981 in Sakal) is a Senegalese football player currently playing for Omani football club Al-Nasr.

Career
He played for several clubs in Morocco such as Mouloudia Oujda and Chabab Massira. It was confirmed on the website of Henan Construction that he completed the transfer to Henan on February 12, 2010.

References

External links

Senegalese footballers
Senegalese expatriate footballers
Living people
Fath Union Sport players
MC Oujda players
ASC Yakaar players
JS Massira players
Henan Songshan Longmen F.C. players
Suwaiq Club players
Al-Nasr SC (Salalah) players
Chinese Super League players
Botola players
Oman Professional League players
1981 births
Association football forwards
Expatriate footballers in China
Expatriate footballers in Morocco
Expatriate footballers in Oman
Senegalese expatriate sportspeople in China
Senegalese expatriate sportspeople in Morocco
Senegalese expatriate sportspeople in Oman